Gisela Heisse is a retired German rower who won a silver and a gold medal in the quad sculls at the European championships of 1959–1960, both of them with Herta Weissig.

References

Year of birth missing (living people)
Living people
East German female rowers
European Rowing Championships medalists